Simon Laner (born 28 January 1984) is an Italian footballer, winner of the 2003 UEFA European Championship with the Italy Under-19 national team, so far being the first and only team in the history of Italian football to do so. He currently plays as a midfielder for Serie D club Adrense.

Career
He made his Serie B debut in a 1–0 defeat for Hellas Verona F.C. against Livorno, on 14 September 2002.

AlbinoLeffe
In summer 2008 Laner joined AlbinoLeffe in a 3-year contract for €200,000 transfer fee.

On 9 August 2010 Laner joined Serie A team Cagliari along with Gabriele Perico on loan with option to co-own the players (announced originally as co-ownership deals only). As part of the deal, Andrea Cocco moved to opposite direction. (Perico and Laner costed Cagliari €750,000 and Cocco costed AlbinoLeffe €50,000.

In June 2011 Laner returned to AlbinoLeffe after Cagliari not excised the buy option.

Return to Verona
On 22 July 2012 Laner was re-signed by Serie B team Verona on a loan deal for the 2012-13 season, for €30,000 loan fee. He finished second in the league thus gaining promotion to the Serie A. The club also excised the option to sign half of his registration rights for €250,000 in a 3-year contract.

On 31 January 2014, Laner was loaned out to Serie B side Novara. In June 2014 Verona acquired Laner, Cocco and sold Simone Calvano back to AlbinoLeffe for €500 each.

The season 2014-15 saw Laner joined Carpi on loan, winning yet another promotion to the Serie A after finishing in first place.

On 25 August 2015 Laner was loaned to Swiss Italian team Chiasso.

On 29 August 2016 Laner was signed by Modena in another loan.

Serie D
On 8 September 2018 Laner joined Serie D club Adrense. With a career-high of 7 goals he played a central part for the newly promoted club to avoid relegation.

References

External links

 Simon Laner National Team Stats at FIGC.it 

1984 births
Living people
Sportspeople from Merano
Italian footballers
Italy youth international footballers
Italian expatriate footballers
Hellas Verona F.C. players
Carrarese Calcio players
U.C. AlbinoLeffe players
S.S.D. Pro Sesto players
S.S.D. Sanremese Calcio players
Cagliari Calcio players
Novara F.C. players
A.C. Carpi players
FC Chiasso players
Serie A players
Serie B players
Serie C players
Serie D players
Swiss Challenge League players
Expatriate footballers in Switzerland
Association football midfielders
Footballers from Trentino-Alto Adige/Südtirol